Hylodes magalhaesi is a species of frog in the family Hylodidae.
It is endemic to Brazil.
Its natural habitats are subtropical or tropical moist montane forest and rivers. It is threatened by habitat loss. They measure between 28 and 32 mm, and live at altitudes of 1400 to 1800 m.

References

Hylodes
Endemic fauna of Brazil
Amphibians of Brazil
Taxonomy articles created by Polbot
Amphibians described in 1964